Mickleby is a village and civil parish in the Scarborough 
district of North Yorkshire, England.

According to the 2011 UK census, Mickleby parish had a population of 283, an increase on the 2001 UK census figure of 165. However, the 2011 census statistics are for an output area which includes Barnby and Ellerby, and for which the 2001 census figure was 274.

References

External links

Villages in North Yorkshire
Civil parishes in North Yorkshire